Khao Khitchakut is a district (amphoe) in the central part of Chanthaburi province, eastern Thailand.

History
The area was separated from Makham district and created as a minor district (king amphoe) on 1 July 1993.

On 15 May 2007 it was upgraded to a full district. With publication in the Royal Gazette on 24 August, the upgrade became official.

Geography
Neighboring districts are (from the west clockwise) Kaeng Hang Maeo, Soi Dao, Pong Nam Ron, Makham, Mueang Chanthaburi, and Tha Mai of Chanthaburi Province.

The important water resource is the Chanthaburi River, which originates within Khao Khitchakut National Park.

Administration
The district is divided into five communes (tambons), which are further subdivided into 46 villages (mubans). There are no municipal (thesabans). There are five tambon administrative organizations (TAO).

References

External links
amphoe.com

Khao Khitchakut